Innocence Canada (formerly known as the Association in Defence of the Wrongly Convicted, AIDWYC), is a Canadian, non-profit legal organization. Based in Toronto, Innocence Canada identifies, advocates for, and helps exonerate individuals who have been convicted of a serious crime which they did not commit and to preventing future wrongful convictions through education and justice system reform.

Founded in 1993 out of the volunteer network that helped exonerate Guy Paul Morin, Innocence Canada has been involved in twenty-one of twenty-six exonerations in Canadian history, including other high-profile cases such as those involving David Milgaard, Steven Truscott, Roméo Phillion, and several victims of disgraced pathologist Charles Smith.

History 
Innocence Canada was founded in February 1993 as the Association in Defence of the Wrongly Convicted (AIDWYC) by a group of volunteers who organized the Justice for Guy Paul Morin Committee after Morin's 1992 wrongful conviction. Founded the same month that Morin was released on bail pending appeal, the AIDWYC decided to broaden its mandate.

Rubin "Hurricane" Carter, who was wrongly convicted in the United States, served as executive director of AIDWYC for over a decade until resigning in 2005.

In 2009, the Association in Defence of the Wrongly Convicted received a one million dollar donation from Ian Cartwright, a retired judge from the Ontario Superior Court of Justice. It also set up the Association in Defence of the Wrongly Convicted Foundation, a registered charity, in July 2010. The grant led to AIDWYC establishing a legal education program on wrongful convictions for groups such as police, law school students, and prisoners.

By Fall 2016, the funding from the Cartwright grant began to dry up. In September 2016, the Association in Defence of the Wrongly Convicted was denied $250,000 a year funding from the federal government. In the same month, it announced that due to lack of funds, it would have to stop taking on new cases, lay off staff, and move out of its downtown Toronto office. At the time, it had a backlog of 85 cases, 16 of which were deemed likely wrongful convictions by Innocence Canada's staff, including three convicted using expert testimony of disgraced pathologist Charles Smith.

In October 2016, the Association in Defence of the Wrongly Convicted rebranded as Innocence Canada, and adopted a new logo consisting of 21 tally marks, one for each of the exonerations they were involved in.

In December 2016, Ontario Attorney General Yasir Naqvi announced that the Ontario government would provide $825,000 in funding over three years, while the Law Society of Ontario would add another $75,000 over the same time period. Despite this funding, Innocence Canada still projected a $150,000 per year shortfall which it hoped to make up through charitable donations. Other funding includes a decade of $230,000 annual donations from the Law Foundation of Ontario, which pledged to continue this funding and add funds for future legal education programs by Innocence Canada.

Notable cases 
Cases that Innocence Canada has been involved in include those of David Milgaard, Guy Paul Morin, Robert Baltovich, Steven Truscott, Nerissa and Odelia Quewezance, seven victims of the disgraced pediatric forensic pathologist Charles Smith, Roméo Phillion, and Thomas Sophonow. It also worked on the case of Anthony Hanemaayer, who had been convicted for a crime actually committed by serial rapist and killer Paul Bernardo, whose confession had not been passed on to Hanemaayer. It has been involved in twenty-one exonerations in Canadian history. Many other people in Canada have by themselves or with the help of a lawyer put substantial evidence on the record on appeal of through the conviction review process that resulted in a new trial being ordered that many would consider to have been "exonerated".

Work 
Applications to Innocence Canada can be made by the convicted person or another interested party and/or through the recommendation of a lawyer. In addition, Innocence Canada has been invited to provide expertise to several public inquiries related to cases or causes of wrongful convictions in Canada. Finally, Innocence Canada offers accredited Continuing Professional Development (CPD) educational seminars for Canadian lawyers in an effort to prevent future wrongful convictions. Innocence Canada is also working to increase the number of educational opportunities for the public, members of police services and the judiciary on issues related to the prevention of wrongful convictions.

Innocence Canada is a member of the Innocence Network, a collective of organizations dedicated to providing pro bono legal and investigative services to individuals who have been wrongly convicted and to preventing wrongful convictions. The Network is composed of innocence organizations across the United States, the United Kingdom, Australia, France, The Netherlands, New Zealand and Ireland.

Innocence Canada estimates that it receives 3.5 million dollars worth of pro bono legal work from Canadian lawyers each year. It has an annual budget of $500,000 to $600,000, much of which is used to pay for expert witnesses and lab tests. Each case roughly takes eight to nine years to see to completion.

Of the Spectrum of cases where wrongful conviction is alleged; the classic who done it cases, or where the accused says they were there but death was accidental or natural causes, she said he said or cases where the conviction was based on a witness who claimed to be there and witness the alleged crime, cases where innocence is claimed because of self defense it is currently unclear from their web site if any type are excluded from consideration from Innocence Canada as of May 2022 

Other innocence project organizations such as Centurion Ministries in the United States make it clear they will not take on some of these types of cases where wrongful conviction is alleged; "We do not take on accidental death, self defense cases, or cases where the defendant had any involvement whatsoever in the crime for which he/she was convicted." The University of British Columbia Innocence Project makes it clear they will not take on so called he said she said cases where the accuser is not currently recanting; "Please note that the UBC Innocence Project will NOT consider convictions of sexual assault where the issue at trial was credibility and there is no new and significant evidence to rebut the credibility finding made at trial (i.e. a known, reliable recantation by the complainant)." It remains to be seen if Innocence Canada will represent people claiming wrongful conviction in the entire spectrum of types of cases. However, as of May 2022 due to resource limitations the organization is only currently accepting applications for homicide review.

References

External links

Legal advocacy organizations based in Canada
Organizations based in Toronto
1993 establishments in Ontario
Innocence Project
Criminal defense organizations
Legal organizations based in Ontario